Bayota is a town in south-central Ivory Coast. It is a sub-prefecture of Gagnoa Department in Gôh Region, Gôh-Djiboua District.

Bayota was a commune until March 2012, when it became one of 1126 communes nationwide that were abolished.

In 2014, the population of the sub-prefecture of Bayota was 54,125.

Villages
The 14 villages of the sub-prefecture of Bayota and their population in 2014 are:

References

Sub-prefectures of Gôh
Former communes of Ivory Coast